The 1927 Italian Grand Prix was a Grand Prix motor race held at Monza on 4 September 1927.

It was part of the 1927 AIACR World Manufacturers' Championship season.

Classification

References

Italian Grand Prix
Italian Grand Prix
Grand Prix
European Grand Prix